One Mississippi is the debut album by American singer and songwriter Brendan Benson, released in 1996 in America and 1997 in Great Britain.

Track listing
All songs written by Brendan Benson unless otherwise stated.

"Tea" – 1:08
"Bird's Eye View" – 1:28
"Sittin' Pretty" – 2:53 (Benson/Jason Falkner)
"I'm Blessed" – 3:00 (Benson/Falkner)
"Crosseyed" – 4:22 (Benson/Falkner)
"Me Just Purely" – 2:44 (Benson/Falkner)
"Got No Secrets" – 3:22
"How 'Bout You" – 3:02
"Emma J" – 3:49
"Insects Rule" – 3:08 (Benson/Falkner)
"Maginary Girl" – 3:06
"House In Virginia" – 3:49 (Benson/Falkner)
"Cherries" – 3:19 (Benson/Falkner)
"Strawberry Rhubarb Pie" (hidden track) – 1:44

The album was re-released in 2003 with the following additional tracks:

"Swamp"
"Jet Stream"
"Crosseyed (Demo)"
"Me Just Purely (Demo)"
"Cherries (Demo)"
"I'm Blessed (Demo)"
"Sittin' Pretty (Demo)"
"Christy (Demo)"

References

Brendan Benson albums
1996 debut albums
Virgin Records albums
Albums produced by Ethan Johns